The 51st Lithuanian Infantry Regiment, known as the 51st Lithuanian Infantry Regiment of His Imperial Highness Heir to the Tsarevich from 1904, was an infantry regiment that served in the Imperial Russian Army.

Formation 
The regiment was formed as the Sveaborg Garrison Regiment on 22 October 1809. This regiment was created by joining the 2nd Fredrikshamn and the Vilmanstrand Garrison battalions. 

On 11 January 1811, from the 12 companies of the Sveaborg Garrison Regiment, the three-battalion Lithuanian Musketeer Regiment was formed, named on February 22, 1811 the Lithuanian Infantry Regiment.

History

Napoleonic Wars 
On 6 November 1811, the regiment, with the Nevsky Infantry Regiment, formed the 2nd Brigade of the 21st Infantry Division. 

In 1812, during the French invasion of Russia, the regiment first fought on 7 October 1812 near Polotsk. the regiment then partook in the battles at Chashniki, Borisov and Studyanka. 

Having crossed the Vistula in 1813, the Lithuanian regiment was part of the corps besieging Danzig, and then were moved to Poznań. In the detachment of General Ferdinand von Wintzingerode, the regiment fought in the battle of Leipzig and on 6 January 1814 crossed the Rhine near Düsseldorf. The Lithuanian regiment fought in the battles of Craonne, Laon and Parisduring the Campaign in north-east France in 1814.

On 4 July 1817, the Lithuanian regiment was assigned to the separate Lithuanian corps.

November Uprising 

On 19 March 1831, the 1st and 2nd battalions, being in the vanguard of Adjutant General Friedrich Caspar von Geismar, were attacked by the entire Polish army and were completely defeated in the Second Battle of Wawer. Most of the regiment's ranks, seeing themselves surrounded on all sides by the superior forces, laid down their weapons and surrendered with two banners and two guns, which were with the regiment. In this battle, the Lithuanian regiment lost its commander, 22 officers and 1,140 lower ranks, including 14 officers and 759 lower ranks of prisoners; only 6 officers and 236 lower ranks fought their way with bayonets. According to the regimental historian: The capitulation of the Lithuanian regiment in the open field appears to be an exceptional example in the Russian army, whose regiments preferred to be exterminated rather than lay their weapons entirely in front of the enemy without trying to pave their way with bayonets. On 3 May 1831, the regiment's remnants arrived in Brest Litovsk, and the Lithuanians began to gradually replenish with the ranks of the 1st and 2nd corps. After its completion, the regiment fought again and pursued Girolamo Ramorino's corps in Galicia.

Fighting in the Caucasus 

In 1841, the 2nd battalion was sent to the Caucasus, to the Black Sea coastline, and took part in an expedition to the land of the Ubykhs. On 22 January 1842, the regiment's 2nd battalion was assigned to the separate Caucasian corps, with a new battalion being formed in the regiment to replace the lost one.

On 8 January 1844, three battalions set out for the Caucasus and were assigned to guard the Georgian Military Road. In the same year, the 1st battalion took part in several expeditions in Little Chechnya to punish the rebellious Karabuzakhs and skirmished many times with the mountaineers.

On 27 February 1845, a battalion of the Uglitsky Jaeger Regiment was attached to the regiment, which made up its 5th battalion. In 1845, the 1st battalion was assigned to the Chechen detachment and, participating in the Dargin campaign, distinguished itself in the Ichkerin battle, when capturing the ruins near Gerzel-aul. For the Dargin campaign, the 1st battalion received a new banner on March 18, 1846 with the inscription "For the campaign to Andi in June and the capture of Dargo on July 6, 1845".

Hungarian Revolution of 1848 
On 10 May 1849, during the Hungarian Revolution of 1848, the regiment campaigned in Transylvania and participated in a battle in the Oytuz gorge  on July 11.

Crimean War 
In 1853, the 5th, 6th, 7th and 8th reserve battalions were formed with the regiment. 

Appointed to reinforce the Caucasian troops, the regiment sailed on September 17, 1853 to the shores of the Black Sea coast and, having landed in Sukhumi and Anaklia, headed for the Transcaucasia. Fighting against Turks on the Inguri River and near the village of Khorshi, the Lithuanians distinguished themselves especially on 4 July 1854 across the Cholokom river, and in the last battle the 3rd battalion bravely attacked the Turkish battery and captured six guns. For the distinction rendered, the 3rd battalion received on October 4, 1854 the St. George banner with the inscription "For distinction in the battle against the Turks across the river. Cholokom June 4, 1854 ". Also, the regiment was awarded on August 30, 1856 badges for headgear with the inscription "For Distinction in 1854 and 1855". From 13 September 1854 to 27 August 1855, the 5th and 6th reserve battalions partook in the Siege of Sevastopol. On 30 August 1856, for their courage and bravery, the regiment was awarded the St. George banners with the inscription "For Sevastopol in 1854 and 1855" and signs on hats with the inscription "For Sevastopol from 13 September 1854 to 27 August 1855". 

On 17 April 1856, after the abolition of the Jaeger regiments, the Lithuanian regiment was renamed an infantry regiment. The same year, the reserve battalions were also abolished and rifle companies were formed in four active battalions.

For the next three years, the regiment took part in operations against the mountaineers of the Western Caucasus and was on several expeditions beyond the Kuban and in the Labinsky District. On 22 July 1859, the Lithuanian Infantry Regiment left the Caucasus.

1860s & 1870s 
On 6 April 1863, a regiment was formed from the Lithuanian Reserve Regiment's 4th battalion and reserve battalions. On 25 March 1864, №51 was added to the regiment's name.

In the Russo-Turkish War (1877–1878), the regiment guarded Crimea's coasts. The two regiments were still brigaded in the 1880s.

On 14 May 1879, the 4th battalion was formed from three rifle companies and the newly formed 16th company.

20th century 
On 30 July 1904, the Grand Duke Alexei Nikolaevich, Tsarevich of Russia was appointed regimental chief, and the Lithuanian regiment was ordered to be called the 51st Lithuanian Infantry Regiment of His Imperial Highness the Heir to the Tsarevich.

World War I 
From 1914 to 8 December 1916, The Lithuanian regiment was part of the Southwestern Front. From then on, it was on the Romanian Front.

Russian Civil War 
After 1918, many of the Lithuanian regiment's officers and even soldiers could not come to terms with the Bolshevik coup and took matters into their own hands. In Stavropol, the brothers Rtishchevs, who belonged to the regiment, raised the first of the well-known "officer uprisings" against the Communist government. In Simferopol, the Lithuanian regiment was revived and it actively participated in the Russian Civil War until 1920.

Regimental insignia 

 Regimental St. George's banner with the inscription "For the campaign in Andi in June and the capture of Dargo on July 6, 1845 and for the difference in the battle against the Turks across the river. Cholokom June 4, 1854" and "1809-1909" with the Alexander's anniversary ribbon. 
 Headwear insignia for lower ranks with the inscription "For Sevastopol from 13 September 1854 to 27 August 1855".

Regimental chiefs 

 01/17/1811 - 09/01/1814 - Colonel (from 01/11/1814 - Major General) Baron .
 07/30/1904 - XX.XX.1918 - the heir to the Tsarevich, Grand Duke Alexei Nikolaevich.

Regiment's commanders 

 10/15/1811 - 03/17/1818 - Major (from 01/11/1814 Lieutenant Colonel) Boris Lukich Sergeyev
 03/17/1818 - 02/28/1829 - lieutenant colonel (from 04/10/1820 Colonel) 
 04/01/1829 - 04/11/1831 - Colonel Mikhail Kurosh
 06/12/1851 - 1855/1856 - Colonel Prince Lev Gagarin
 02/17/1856 - 1859/1860 - Colonel Nikolai Chikhachev
 1859/1860 - хх.хх. 1868/1869 - Colonel Pyotr Shafirov
 08/02/1869 - 28/11/1874 - Colonel Pyotr Artsybashev
 11/30/1874 - 12/17/1878 - Colonel 
 xx.12.1878 - xx.01.1886 - Colonel Alexander Kalinin
 01/19/1886 - 11/03/1887 - Colonel Konstantin Tserpitsky
 11.11.1887 - 29.10.1892 - Colonel Giorgi Kazbegi
 11/23/1892 - 07/16/1894 - Colonel Nikolai Grotenfeld
 08/02/1894 - 04/17/1898 - Colonel Alexander Myagkov
 06/02/1898 - 04/04/1901 - Colonel Ivan Kholodovsky
 05/22/1901 - 02/06/1905 - Colonel Mikhail Nikulin
 02.24.1905 - 03.24.1910 - Colonel Dmitry Cherepakhin-Ivaschenko
 03.24.1910 - 01.03.1915 - Colonel 
 01.24.1915 - 04.29.1915 - Colonel Alexey Tkachenko
 04/29/1915 - 07/29/1915 - Colonel 
 08.24.1915 - 05.28.1916 - Colonel Ivan Tarbeev
 05/31/1916 - 10/23/1916 - Colonel Mikhail Stakhov
 12/14/1916 - 04/24/1917 - Colonel Konstantin Lisitsyn
 05/27/1917 - xx.xx.xxxx - Colonel Bronislav-Evgeniy Pogorzhelsky

References

Sources

See also 

 51st Lithuanian Regiment's uniform from 1904

Military units and formations disestablished in 1918
Military units and formations established in 1809
Infantry regiments of the Russian Empire